Lynne Adams is an American actress and writer.

Adams played the role of Leslie Jackson Bauer Norris Bauer from 1966 to 1971 and again from August 1973 to June 1976 on The Guiding Light. She was the second generation in her family to act on the program; both her parents had roles in the radio incarnation in the 1940s. She also appeared on The Secret Storm in the role of Amy Kincaid from September 1971 to May 1973.

Adams has written and produced a number of stage productions, including Two Faced, upon which the feature film Made-Up was based. Adams wrote and produced Made-Up, co-starring her younger sister and brother-in-law, Brooke Adams and Tony Shalhoub, as well as Eva Amurri, Gary Sinise and Lance Krall.

Personal life
Adams is the daughter of Rosalind (née Gould), an actress, and Robert K. Adams, a producer, actor (noted for his appearances on The Goldbergs and Your Family and Mine), and former vice president of CBS, as well as a descendant of presidents John Adams and John Quincy Adams. She is the older sister of actress Brooke Adams.

Filmography

References

External links

20th-century American dramatists and playwrights
American soap opera actresses
Living people
Place of birth missing (living people)
20th-century American actresses
21st-century American actresses
Year of birth missing (living people)